The fourth Minnesota Territorial Legislature first convened on January 5, 1853. The 9 members of the Minnesota Territorial Council were elected during the General Election of October 14, 1851, and the 18 members of the Minnesota House of Representatives were elected during the General Election of October 12, 1852.

Sessions 
The territorial legislature met in a regular session from January 5, 1853, to March 5, 1853. There were no special sessions of the fourth territorial legislature.

Party summary

Council

House of Representatives

Leadership 
President of the Council
Martin McLeod (D-Bloomington)

Speaker of the House
David Day (W-Long Prairie)

Members

Council

House of Representatives

Notes

References

External links 
 Minnesota Legislators Past & Present - Session Search Results (Session 0.4, Senate)
 Minnesota Legislators Past & Present - Session Search Results (Session 0.4, House)
Journal of the House of Representatives During the Fourth Session of the Legislative Assembly of the Territory of Minnesota

00.4th
1850s in Minnesota Territory